Pedro Miguel da Cunha e Sá (born 1 December 1993) is a Portuguese professional footballer who plays for Portimonense S.C. as a defensive midfielder.

Club career
Born in Póvoa de Varzim, Sá joined hometown club Varzim SC's youth ranks at the age of 9. He made his senior debut with eight games in the third division in 2012–13, and played regularly in the next three seasons, the last of which in Segunda Liga; he also appeared in two matches for their reserves in the Porto Football Association's first district league.

Ahead of the 2016–17 campaign, Sá signed with Portimonense S.C. of the same league– in July 2018, a court in Póvoa de Varzim ordered his previous club to pay some of the transfer fee to his agents, Foot Emotions. The team from the Algarve won promotion in his first year, as champions.

Sá made his Primeira Liga debut on 7 August 2017, playing the entire 2–1 home win against Boavista FC. He added a further 27 appearances during the season, scoring in a 3–3 draw at Vitória S.C. on 23 October.

Career statistics

References

External links

1993 births
Living people
People from Póvoa de Varzim
Sportspeople from Porto District
Portuguese footballers
Association football midfielders
Primeira Liga players
Liga Portugal 2 players
Segunda Divisão players
Varzim S.C. players
Portimonense S.C. players